The Santa Cruz League is a high school athletic league that is part of the CIF Southern Section. Members are independent schools located around Los Angeles County.

Members
 Saddleback Valley Christian Schools
 The Webb Schools
 Capistrano Valley Christian Schools
 Fairmont Preparatory Academy
 Santa Clarita Christian School
 Southlands Christian Schools

References

CIF Southern Section leagues